Pedro Alfredo Gallina (30 March 1949 – 21 June 2022) was an Argentine footballer who played as a forward for clubs in Argentina and Chile.

Career
Gallina made his professional debut playing for Ferro Carril Oeste in a match versus All Boys in 4 April 1970. He reached to make twenty six appearances for the club until December 1972, with a step on loan to Gimnasia LP in 1973, playing eighteen matches.

In 1974 he moved to Chile to join Lota Schwager, playing 54 matches and scoring 23 goals until 1975. He became an idol of the club since it reached two of the best seasons of its history and was the runner-up of 1975 Copa Chile. In 1976 he played for Universidad Católica, becoming the team top goalscorer with ten goals. For Everton de Viña del Mar he played between 1977 and 1979, being remembered for a great goal versus Ñublense in 1978, which was chosen the best goal of the year and is considered the best goal scored at the Estadio Sausalito up to now. In 1980, he moved to Cobresal in the Chilean Segunda División, the first season as a professional club, becoming the team top goalscorer again with 11 goals.

Following his retirement, Gallina made his home in Buenos Aires, Argentina, and died on 21 June 2022, at the age of 73.

References

External links
 
 Pedro Gallina at playmakerstats.com (English version of ceroacero.es)

1949 births
2022 deaths
Argentine footballers
Footballers from Buenos Aires
Association football forwards
Ferro Carril Oeste footballers
Club de Gimnasia y Esgrima La Plata footballers
Lota Schwager footballers
Club Deportivo Universidad Católica footballers
Everton de Viña del Mar footballers
Cobresal footballers
Chilean Primera División players
Primera Nacional players 
Argentine Primera División players
Primera B de Chile players 
Argentine expatriate footballers
Argentine expatriate sportspeople in Chile
Expatriate footballers in Chile